William Powlett Powlett (18 March 1758 – 8 March 1821) was an English landowner who lived at Lainston House in Hampshire.

Biography
He was born William Powlett Smyth, only son of the Rev. Richard Smyth, rector of Myddle, and his wife Annabella. He adopted the surname Powlett as heir to the Marrick estate of his maternal grandfather William Powlett. He was High Sheriff of Hampshire in 1783. A Whig, he sat in Parliament for Totnes from 1790 to 1796. He was married, but had no children, and his nephews Charles and Henry adopted the surname Powlett as his heirs.

References

1758 births
1821 deaths
Alumni of New College, Oxford
High Sheriffs of Hampshire
British MPs 1790–1796
Members of the Parliament of Great Britain for Totnes
Whig members of the Parliament of Great Britain